Siumar Ferreira Nazaré ( Siumar; born June 7, 1983 in Eunápolis, Bahia, Brazil), also known as Mamá in Brazil, is a Brazilian former professional footballer. He played for Italian side Treviso and made one appearance in Serie A, against Udinese in the 2005–06 season.

Notes and references

External links
Siumar Ferreira Nazaré at HKFA
CBF Database 
Profile at footballplus.com

1983 births
Living people
Brazilian footballers
Brazilian expatriate footballers
Association football midfielders
Calcio Padova players
Treviso F.B.C. 1993 players
Hong Kong Rangers FC players
Eastern Sports Club footballers
Serie A players
Expatriate footballers in Italy
Hong Kong First Division League players
Expatriate footballers in Hong Kong
Brazilian expatriate sportspeople in Hong Kong
A.S.D. Calcio Ivrea players